E. C. Knight (1879 fl. -1915 fl.) was an English illustrator. He  undertook zoological entomological and botanical drawing, lithography, and chromolithography
for William Weekes Fowler, Frederic Moore, Edmund Reitter and Emily Mary Bowdler Sharpe among others.  Knight worked in association with the Zoological Society of London.

E. C. and his brother Horace Knight worked for Messrs. West, Newman & Co., in London.

References

Database of Illustrators University of Stuttgart

Further reading
 

English illustrators
Natural history illustrators
19th-century births
20th-century deaths